Captain Robert Bolling Kelly (June 9, 1913 - January 23, 1989) was an officer of the United States Navy who served during World War II.

Biography
Kelly was born in New York City, and graduated from the U.S. Naval Academy at Annapolis in 1935.

World War II

Kelly took part in the operation to evacuate General Douglas MacArthur and his staff from Corregidor to Mindanao, on the night of March 12/13, 1942 and was subsequently awarded the Silver Star.

The next morning PT-34 was attacked by Japanese aircraft, forced to beach and then destroyed. Kelly, who was wounded in the action, was awarded the Navy Cross and the Distinguished Service Cross for "distinguished conduct and extraordinary courage in combat."

Kelly commanded Motor Torpedo Boat Squadron 9 in 1943–44, and earned another Silver Star for his actions during the New Georgia and Bougainville Campaigns.

With the rank of commander, Kelly commanded the destroyer  from June 1945 until her decommissioning on May 31, 1946, seeing action during the battle of Okinawa, and being awarded the Legion of Merit.

Post-war career
Kelly commanded the icebreaker  between 1950–56 and the destroyer tender  in 1958–59.

Kelly retired in 1961 with the rank of captain. He worked for the Aerospace Division of Martin Marietta, and later as a counselor of vocational rehabilitation for the State of Maryland.

Kelly died of pneumonia at Howard County General Hospital in Columbia, Maryland, and is buried in Arlington National Cemetery.

In media
MTB Squadron 3's exploits in the Philippines in 1941–42 were portrayed in the 1942 book They Were Expendable by William L. White, and the 1945 film of the same name, in which the character of "Rusty Ryan", played by John Wayne, was based on Kelly.

References

External links
 PT Boat Squadrons 6-10

1913 births
1989 deaths
Martin Marietta people
Military personnel from New York City
United States Naval Academy alumni
United States Navy personnel of World War II
United States Navy officers
Recipients of the Navy Cross (United States)
Recipients of the Distinguished Service Cross (United States)
Recipients of the Silver Star
Recipients of the Legion of Merit
Deaths from pneumonia in Maryland
Burials at Arlington National Cemetery